Ada Sawyer Garrett (1856–1938) was a late 19th-century Chicago socialite.

Early years
The daughter of Dr. Sidney Sawyer and the former Elizabeth Butterfield, Ada was a popular society debutante. She married T. Mauro Garrett, a railroad official. She and her mother subdivided  of land on the Northwest Side of Chicago that had been purchased by Ada's grandfather, attorney Justin Butterfield, to create Logan Square, a genteel neighborhood of mansions.

Last years and death
When Ada Garrett's husband died in 1900, she went into seclusion, devoting her time to managing her finances. She died in 1938, leaving $2,250,000 to the Chicago History Museum, the Art Institute of Chicago, the University of Chicago, a number of Chicago hospitals and homes for the poor, disabled, and orphans, and to relatives.

Legacy
Ada Street and Ada Park in Chicago are named for Ada Sawyer Garrett.

References

1856 births
1938 deaths
American debutantes
People from Chicago